Leshchev is a rural locality (a khutor) in Pokrovskoye Rural Settlement, Leninsky District, Volgograd Oblast, Russia. The population was 181 as of 2010. There are 12 streets.

Geography 
Leshchev is located on Caspian Depression, 21 km northeast of Leninsk (the district's administrative centre) by road. Kovylny is the nearest rural locality.

References 

Rural localities in Leninsky District, Volgograd Oblast